Hattoria yakushimensis is the only species of liverwort in the genus Hattoria, in the family Anastrophyllaceae. It is endemic to Japan.  Its natural habitat is temperate forests. It is threatened by habitat loss.

The genus name of Hattoria is in honour of Sinsuke (Sinske, Shinsuke) Hattori (1915-1992), who was a Japanese botanist (Bryology) and Professor of Botany at the University of Tokyo.

References

Jungermanniales
Jungermanniales genera
Monotypic bryophyte genera
Endemic flora of Japan
Vulnerable plants
Taxonomy articles created by Polbot